Kawnghka (Shan: ၵွင်းၶႃး) is a village in Shan State, Myanmar (Burma). It was the headquarters of the Kachin Defense Army (KDA).

References

Populated places in Shan State